GWHS may refer to:
 Gigawatt-hours (GWhs), a unit of energy

Schools 
 George Washington High School (disambiguation)
 George Whittell High School, Zephyr Cove, Nevada, United States
 Glenbard West High School, Glen Ellyn, Illinois, United States